Istrefi is an Albanian surname. Notable people with the surname include:

Era Istrefi (born 1994), Kosovar singer and songwriter 
Gzim Istrefi (born 1991), Swedish footballer of Albanian descent 
Nora Istrefi (born 1986), Kosovar singer, sister of Era

Albanian-language surnames